Canyon Creek may refer to:

Inhabited places

Canada
 Canyon Creek, Alberta, Canada

United States
 Canyon Creek, Montana
 Canyon Creek, Austin, Texas, a neighborhood
 Canyon Creek, Hood County, Texas, a census-designated place
 Canyon Creek, Washington, a census-designated place in Snohomish County

Rivers and streams 
 Canyon Creek (Arizona)
 Canyon Creek (Salt River tributary), Arizona
 Canyon Creek (California)
 Canyon Creek (Teton River), a creek in Idaho
 Canyon Creek (Montana), a stream in Flathead County, Montana